Yaharlu (also Romanized as Yaharlū; also known as Yaharlī) is a village in Karaftu Rural District, in the Central District of Takab County, West Azerbaijan Province, Iran. At the 2006 census, its population was 253, in 53 families.

References 

Populated places in Takab County